Protokklisi ( meaning the first church) is a village and a community in the central part of the Evros regional unit in Greece.  Protoklissi is in the municipal unit of Orfeas. In 2001 its population was 260 for the village and 790 for the community, including the village Agriani. Protokklisi is located about 15 km northwest of Soufli, in the valley of a right tributary of the river Evros.

Population

History

The name of the village during the Ottoman rule was Bashklise (Başkilise in Turkish, Башклисе Bašklise in Bulgarian). In 1830, it had 100 Bulgarian families, in 1878 and 1912 the village had 105 Bulgarian families. According to professor Lyubomir Miletich, the 1912 population contained 100 Bulgarian families.

After a brief period of Bulgarian rule between 1913 and 1919, it became part of Greece. As a result its Bulgarian population was exchanged with Greek refugees, mainly from today's Turkey.

People

Pano Angelov (Пано Ангелов, 1879–1903), Bulgarian revolutionary leader

See also
List of settlements in the Evros regional unit

External links
Protoklissi on GTP Travel Pages

References

Populated places in Evros (regional unit)